Casimiro Abdon Irala Arguello, SJ, known as Padre Irala (4 March 1936), is a Paraguayan-born Brazilian Jesuit priest, writer, musician and songwriter.

Biography 

His father was a musician and taught him the first notes to the guitar. His father, Don Abdón Irala, composed the first mass sung in Guarani, in the decade of 1960. Casimiro participated early in the Catholic Church, having been a participant in Catholic Action. He entered in the Society of Jesus to be a Jesuit at the age of 20, in 1956, leaving his engineering career. He studied theology in São Leopoldo, Rio Grande do Sul, being ordained priest at age 33, on 14 December 1968 in Asunción, Paraguay. On 27 December 2018, Irala celebrated the Golden Jubilee in the Capela Santo Inácio, located in the Antônio Vieira College.

Career 

Irala is the author of one of the most consecrated songs in the Catholic medium, the Prayer of St. Francis of Assisi present in the vinyl compact of four songs "Irala Canta" (May 1968). In 2008 Father Irala re-recorded the famous song at an OPA event. The song "Prayer of San Francisco", was used in the novel of Rede Globo, Velho Chico. The campaign 'In whose name, San Francisco?' used the same song with a musical arrangement of Tim Rescala. In 1989, the song was re-recorded by Fagner on the album O Quinze, and in 2003, it appeared in an acoustic version in Ana Carolina's voice on the DVD Estampado. In 2013, the song was re-recorded for the official soundtrack of WYD 2013, in the Heart of the Journey, being interpreted by Adriana Arydes, Eliana Ribeiro, Guilherme de Sá, Sister Kelly Patrícia, Father Fábio de Melo and Father Marcelo Rossi. Still in 2013, an instrumental version was released by the OPA Group.

He worked with Father Harold Rahm of the Christian Leadership Training (TLC) and founded the TLC Musical (TLM) in 1970, a group linked to TLC that also expanded and became the OPA - Prayer for Art in 1976. Among the people who passed the OPA are the singers Daniela Mercury and Ana Paula Bouzas and the emeritus Bishop Gílio Felício.

Discography 

 1967 – Juventude e Alegria – Pe. Irala (first LP)
 1968 – Irala Canta – Pe. Irala
 1968 – Meu Rosto é Alegria – Pe. Irala
 1969 – Transpondo Fronteiras – Vamos Cantar o Amor – Pe. Irala
 1976 – Nostalgia de Deus – Pe. Irala
 1977 – Irala – Pe. Irala
 1985 – Clara Luz – Pe. Irala SJ
 2007 – Provocação – Pe. Irala SJ e OPA group
 2007 – Gente Boa – Pe. Irala SJ and OPA group
 2007 – Maria – Pe. Irala SJ and OPA group
 2007 – Meditação para a paz – Pe. Irala SJ and OPA group
 2007 – É Natal – Pe. Irala SJ and OPA group
 2007 – Missa do Ano Jubilar Inaciano – Canções – Pe. Irala SJ and OPA group

Published Books 

 Pe Irala SJ (1971). O Porque do Sucesso. [S.I.]: Edições Loyola.
 Pe Irala SJ (1975). Igreja Ficção. [S.I.]: Edições Loyola.

See also 

 Contemporary Catholic liturgical music
 Christian music
 Padre Zezinho

References

External links 
 OPA – Oração pela Arte

1936 births

Living people
20th-century Brazilian Jesuits
Brazilian Roman Catholic singers
Brazilian singer-songwriters
Brazilian people of Paraguayan descent
People from Asunción